Usti is a village in Membey district, Pegunungan Arfak Regency in West Papua province, Indonesia. Its population is 163.

Climate
Usti has a subtropical highland climate (Cfb) with heavy rainfall year-round.

References

Villages in West Papua
Populated places in West Papua